The People's Radical Party (abbr. НРС or NRS) was the dominant ruling party of Kingdom of Serbia and later Kingdom of Serbs, Croats and Slovenes from the late 1880s until 1928.

History
The founding of the party was related to the circle of Serbian youth followers of Svetozar Marković and Nikola Pašić in Zurich. The leaders of this group proposed a political program in which they called for:

change of constitution
freedom of the press and open politics
judicial independence
reform of the education system
enhanced local self-government

The first main assembly of the People's Radical Party was in July 1882 in Kragujevac. The Radical's program, inspired by French Radicalism, was adopted, and Nikola Pašić was elected as the president of the central committee. The Radical Party had its own daily (Samouprava, "Self-Government"), which was critical of the ruling monarchy, demanding democracy, public liberties, and liberal reforms of the bureaucratic system. The Radical leaders, mostly educated at home and abroad Pera Todorovic, Nikola Pašić, Pera Velimirović, Sima Lozanić, Lazar Paču, Jovan Djaja, Andra Nikolić, 
Ranko Tajsić, Lazar Dokić, Raša Milošević, Đura Ljočić, Gliša Geršić, Svetomir Nikolajević, Kosta Taušanović, etc. with other urban and provincial elites (Stojan Protić, Adam Bogosavljević, Aca Stanojević, Dimitrije Katić, Sava Grujić), were the first that successfully mobilized Serbian peasantry and the provincial middle classes (including teachers, peasant leaders and priests). Among others, Radicals attracted important intellectuals, diplomats, and university professors, such as Milovan Milovanović, Milenko Vesnić, Mihailo Vujić, Đorđe Simić, Jovan Žujović.

In September 1883, the Timok Rebellion broke out in eastern Serbia when King Milan Obrenović declared that peasants' arms should be confiscated by the army. He charged the Radicals that with their article Disarmament of the people's army in Samouprava, they had encouraged the peasants to refuse to give up their weapons. The rebellion was set down in ten days. Most of the party head committee was captured in the aftermath, apart from Pašić himself and a few others, who escaped to the Principality of Bulgaria. The régime sentenced many of these Radicals to death, including those who were in absentia. However, after some time, amnesty was given to certain Radicals who agreed to enter Obrenović's government in 1887.

The Radicals were instrumental in the adoption of the 1888 Serbian Constitution, which established parliamentary democracy, almost all of the political programs. The parliamentary rule was introduced, rights were guaranteed as well as the freedom of citizens and local self-government. Radicals disposed of, after 1889, with almost 80 percent of the popular vote. The Radicals were ardent supporters of the unification of all Serb-inhabited lands in the Balkans and adopted the slogan "Balkans to the Balkan nations". In foreign policy, strongly anti-Austrian, it was mostly Russophile and Francophile, supporting the Franco-Russian Alliance and the Triple Entente.

After the compromise with the Crown in 1901, the younger group within the People's Radical Party formed a dissident faction in 1901 that in 1905, after failed reconciliation efforts with Pašić emerged as a new political party, the "Independent Radical Party", led by Ljubomir Stojanović and Ljubomir Davidović that was in power only in 1905 and 1906. After the Great War, Independent Radicals were transformed into the Republican and Democratic Party.

After the return of the Karađorđević dynasty to the throne of Serbia in 1903 (following the May Overthrow), under the newly elected king Peter I Karađorđević, a single-chamber National Assembly was introduced, and the new 1903 Constitution was slightly revised version of the 1888 Constitution, annulled by Aleksandar I Obrenović in 1894. Serbia became a parliamentary and constitutional monarchy. After the revolutionary government in 1903, the Radicals of Pašić formed several governments that began the important reforms of the nation.

The Radical governments led the Kingdom of Serbia through its Golden Age (1903-1914), as well as through the First World War. In 1917, the Yugoslav Committee signed the Corfu Declaration with Nikola Pašić, calling for the formation of a South Slavic state. After the war, the State of Slovenes, Croats, and Serbs was formed from lands previously part of the Austro-Hungarian Empire by the Croatian Parliament and others. Prince Alexander, citing the Corfu Declaration, declared the Kingdom of Serbs, Croats, and Slovenes. The Croatian Parliament voted to incorporate itself into the National Assembly of the State of Slovenes, Croats, and Serbs, and it was represented by it. The representatives of the National Assembly agreed to merge with the Kingdom of Serbia.

The Kingdom's prime ministers from 1918 to 1928 were all Serbian with the People's Radical Party holding the prime ministry for eight of the years. In the National Assembly, outdated electoral rules and Yugoslav police actions against opponents of the royal family favoured the Radical Party. For example, in the 1923 elections, the party received a quarter of the kingdom's vote, but census results from 1910 assigned Serbia a greater representation, and the Radical Party took just over a third of the Assembly's seats.

After Pašić's death in 1926, Aca Stanojević became the party's president. In 1929, King Alexander declared a personal rule banning the People's Radical Party and others. Certain members of the party entered into Alexander's governments, and Stanojević called for the end of the royal dictatorship and the return to parliamentary democracy and local self-government.

Radical Prime Ministers

Electoral performance

Kingdom of Serbia

Kingdom of Yugoslavia

References

Bibliography 
 
 Alex N. Dragnich, Nikola Pašić, Serbia and Yugoslavia, New Brunswick, New Jersey 1974.
 Alex N.Dragnich, The Development of Parliamentary Government in Serbia, East European Monographs, Boulder Colorado 1978.
 Michael Boro Petrovich, The History of Modern Serbia 1804-1918, 2 vols. I-II, Harcourt Brace Jovanovich, New York 1976.
 Gale Stokes, Politics as Development. The Emergence of Political Parties in Nineteenth-Century Serbia, Durham and London, Duke University Press 1990.
 Milan St.Protić, «The French Radical Movement and the Radical party in Serbia. A Parallel Analysis of Ideologies», in: Richard B. Spence, Linda L. Nelson (eds.), Scholar, Patriot, Mentor. Historical Essays in Honor of Dimitrije Djordjević, East European Monographs, Boulder Colorado 1992.

1881 establishments in Serbia
Agrarian parties in Serbia
Pan-Slavism
Political parties established in 1881
Political parties in the Kingdom of Serbia
Political parties in the Kingdom of Yugoslavia
Serbian nationalism
Yugoslavism